Nancy Napolski-Johnson (born January 14, 1974) is a retired American sport shooter. She competed and won a gold medal in the 2000 Summer Olympics (10-meter air rifle for women) at 26. Nancy Johnson also competed in the 1996 Olympics but finished in 36th place.

Early life 
Nancy Johnson grew up in Downers Grove, Illinois, and was introduced to shooting at a young age. Her desire for shooting came from hunting deer with her father Ben Napolski. At age 15 she was initially interested in archery, but there were no establishments that supported it, so she joined the rifle club three blocks from her family's house (Downers Grove Junior Rifle Club). Her coach while at Downers Grove Rifle Club was Obie Elision. In high school, she shot competitively all four years against other private clubs and some high school clubs. At age 17 she had a mysterious ailment that made her lose feeling on the left side of her body, in which she needed  intense physical therapy to regain her strength. After six months her condition disappeared on its own. Her mother Diane died before she could see her win the gold medal for the 2000 Summer Olympic games. She went to college at the University of Kentucky (class of 1996). Here she captured the individual national championship in air rifle in 1994 and was a three-time, first-team, All-American (1994,1995 and 1996). She obtained a Bachelor in Science degree in Horticulture. In 1997 on her way to the National Championships in California, she was involved in an auto accident that left her injured with a sprained wrist and unable to compete.

Training 
While training, she would be at the range practicing for 7.5 hours a day, six days a week. She would exercise by doing extensive cardio and rigorous weight training exercises. Her daily routine typically consisted of two hours of aerobic exercise, followed up by weightlifting. She would increase her stamina for a slower and more steady heartbeat for increased accuracy for her shots. Her training provided her the ability to have a heart rate of 45 to 50 beats per minute. When not using the ranges with the Army at Fort Benning, GA, Nancy would use a RIKA home trainer to simulate activities usually conducted on the range.

Personal life 
She married Kenneth Johnson in 1997 and they currently reside in Crawfordville, Florida. Ken was a Staff Sergeant in the United States Army and competed for the U.S. Army Marksmanship Unit. Nancy contributes most of her past success to the training she received from the Army coaches (Bill Krilling) and the ranges they offered. Ken also competed for the US men's air rifle team. Nancy is trying to organize a grassroots shooting program in the area where she lives in Crawfordville, Florida.

References

 After the gold rush. (n.d.). Retrieved March 29, 2019, from https://www.lib.niu.edu/2001/oi010116.html
 Congressional Record (Bound Edition), Volume 146 (2000), Part 13 - INTRODUCTION OF A RESOLUTION CONGRATULATING NANCY JOHNSON, A NATIVE OF DOWNERS GROVE, IL, ON WINNING THE FIRST GOLD MEDAL OF THE 2000 SUMMER OLYMPIC GAMES IN SYDNEY, AUSTRALIA. (n.d.). Retrieved March 29, 2019, from https://www.govinfo.gov/content/pkg/CRECB-2000-pt13/html/CRECB-2000-pt13-Pg19134-2.htm
 Hipps, T., & Hasenauer, H. (2000). Focus on People. Soldiers, 55(12), 30.
 Interview with Nancy Johnson. (n.d.). Retrieved March 29, 2019, from Pilkington Competition website: http://www.pilkguns.com/intnj-shtml/
 Kelley, S. (2000). OLYMPICS Insider. Sporting News, 224(39), 62.
 Nancy JOHNSON - Olympic Shooting | United States of America. (2016, June 21). Retrieved March 29, 2019, from International Olympic Committee website: https://www.olympic.org/nancy-johnson
 Nancy Napolski Johnson (2010) - UK Athletics Hall of Fame. (n.d.). Retrieved March 29, 2019, from University of Kentucky Athletics website: http://ukathletics.com/hof.aspx?hof=46
 Nancy Napolski-Johnson Bio, Stats, and Results. (n.d.). Retrieved March 29, 2019, from Olympics at Sports-Reference.com website: [https://web.archive.org/web/20200418023301/https://www.sports-reference.com/olympics/athletes/na/nancy-napolski-johnson-1.html Nancy Napolski Johnson at Sports Reference]
 Pennington, B. (2000, September 16). Well-Rested, American Wins the First Gold. New York Times, Late Edition (East Coast); New York, N.Y., p. D.7.
Profile: "Nancy Johnson" Archived 2007-03-08 at the Wayback Machine databaseOlympics.com (Retrieved on January 13, 2008)
 Scott Simon. (n.d.). Analysis: First medals of Summer Olympics handed out in shooting and swimming. Weekend Edition Saturday (NPR).
 Shooter Spotlight: Nancy Johnson : pronematch.com. (n.d.). Retrieved March 29, 2019, from http://pronematch.com/shooter-spotlight-nancy-johnson/
 Tribune, R. D. S. to the. (n.d.). DUPAGE NATIVE SHOOTS FOR OLYMPICS. Retrieved March 29, 2019, from chicagotribune.com website: https://www.chicagotribune.com/news/ct-xpm-1999-08-06-9908060392-story.html

External links

1974 births
Living people
American female sport shooters
United States Distinguished Marksman
ISSF rifle shooters
Shooters at the 1996 Summer Olympics
Shooters at the 2000 Summer Olympics
Olympic gold medalists for the United States in shooting
Olympic medalists in shooting
Kentucky Wildcats rifle shooters
Medalists at the 2000 Summer Olympics
Shooters at the 1999 Pan American Games
Pan American Games medalists in shooting
Pan American Games silver medalists for the United States
Medalists at the 1999 Pan American Games
21st-century American women
20th-century American women